On 22 December 1978, a small Cessna 188 aircraft, piloted by Jay Prochnow, became lost over the Pacific Ocean. The only other aircraft in the area that was able to assist was a commercial Air New Zealand flight. After several hours of searching, the crew of the Air New Zealand flight located the lost Cessna and led it to Norfolk Island, where the plane landed safely.

The incident
Jay Prochnow, a retired US Navy pilot, was delivering a Cessna 188 from the United States to Australia. Prochnow had a colleague who was flying another Cessna 188 alongside him. The long trip would be completed in four stages. On the morning of 20 December, both pilots took off from Pago Pago. His colleague crashed on takeoff but was unharmed. Prochnow landed and set out the following day to Norfolk Island.

When Prochnow arrived at the region where he believed Norfolk Island was, he was unable to see the island. He informed Air Traffic Control (ATC), but at this point, there was no immediate danger. He continued searching; after locating more homing beacons from other islands, he realised his automatic direction finder had malfunctioned and he was now lost somewhere over the Pacific Ocean. He alerted ATC and declared an emergency.

There was only one aircraft in the vicinity, Air New Zealand Flight 103, a McDonnell Douglas DC-10 travelling from Fiji to Auckland. The flight had 88 passengers on board. The captain was Gordon Vette, the first officer was Arthur Dovey, and the flight engineer was Gordon Brooks. Vette knew that if they did not try to help, Prochnow would almost certainly die. Vette was a navigator, and at the time of the incident, he still held his licence. Furthermore, another passenger, Malcolm Forsyth, was also a navigator; when he heard about the situation he volunteered to help. As neither Prochnow nor the crew of the DC-10 knew where the Cessna was, the crew had to devise creative ways to find it. By this time, contact between both aircraft had been made on long-range HF radio. Prochnow had crossed the international date line, and the date was now 22 December. 
Vette was able to use the setting sun to gain an approximate position of the Cessna. He instructed the Cessna to point directly at the setting sun. He did the same and noted the difference in heading between the aircraft as four degrees. After making an allowance for the different altitudes of the aircraft, the difference in sunset times between the aircraft and Norfolk Island was also noted. This data allowed the crew to calculate that the Cessna must be southwest of the DC-10 by about 400 nautical miles. About 25 minutes after turning in that direction, contact on short-range VHF radio was established. This had a range of 200 nautical miles. It was hoped the DC-10 would be making a vapour trail to make it more visible. After contacting Auckland it was determined that weather conditions were not suitable for a trail. Brooks knew that by dumping fuel they could produce a vapour trail. As the search was getting more and more desperate, they decided to try it. Prochnow did not see the trail, and darkness was increasing. Vette wanted all the passengers to be involved, so he asked them to look out of the windows and invited small groups to come to the cockpit.

As the light conditions became darker, Prochnow considered ditching, but Vette encouraged him not to give up. So they also used a technique known as "aural boxing" to try to pinpoint the small plane; this took over an hour to complete. Once it had been done, they had a much better approximation of Prochnow's position. The DC-10 used its strobe lights to try to make itself more visible to the Cessna. It took some time, but eventually, Prochnow reported seeing light. This was not the DC-10, it was an oil rig, and Prochnow went towards it. This was identified as Penrod, which was being towed from New Zealand to Singapore. This gave Prochnow's exact position. After some confusion about the exact position of the Penrod, it was finally established that the estimates of the crew of the DC-10 were accurate. Prochnow was able to make it to Norfolk Island with his remaining fuel. He touched down on Norfolk Island after being in the air for twenty-three hours and five minutes.

Events following the incident
McDonnell Douglas awarded the crew a certificate of commendation for "the highest standards of compassion, judgment and airmanship."

Gordon Brooks was the flight engineer on Air New Zealand Flight 901 and was killed when the DC-10 crashed into Mount Erebus, Antarctica, on 28 November 1979. Vette published a book about the Flight 901 disaster, called Impact Erebus.

The incident was dramatised in the American 1993 made-for-TV movie Mercy Mission - the Rescue of Flight 771. It starred Scott Bakula as Jay Prochnow (which was changed to Perkins in the movie) and Robert Loggia as Gordon Vette.

References
Emergency; Crisis in the Cockpit, Stanley Stewart, pp 1–25.

External links

A detailed explanation of the calculations the crew used to find the Cessna
Article on Captain Gordon Vette discussing his role in the investigation of the Erebus crash

Air New Zealand accidents and incidents
Aviation accidents and incidents in 1978
1978 in Australia
December 1978 events in Oceania